Stephen George Waxman (born 1945) is an American neurologist and neuroscientist. He served as Chairman of the Department of Neurology at Yale School of Medicine, and Neurologist-in-Chief at Yale-New Haven Hospital from 1986 until 2009. As of 2018, he is the Bridget Flaherty Professor of Neurology, Neurobiology, and Pharmacology at Yale University. He founded the Yale University Neuroscience & Regeneration Research Center in 1988 and is its Director.  He previously held faculty positions at Harvard Medical School, MIT, and Stanford Medical School. He is also visiting professor at University College London. He is the editor-in-chief of The Neuroscientist and Neuroscience Letters.

Education
Waxman received his BA from Harvard University (1967), and his PhD (1970) and MD (1972) degrees from Albert Einstein College of Medicine. After finishing medical and graduate school, Waxman trained as a Postdoctoral Fellow at MIT, a Clinical Fellow at Harvard Medical School, and a Resident at Boston City Hospital until 1975.

Research
Waxman has built on the "molecular revolution" to study, at a fundamental level, how neurons and glial cells work within the normal nervous system, and why they do not work properly in various diseased states. His laboratory studies isolated nerve cells in culture, and rodents with experimental autoimmune encephalomyelitis, a model of multiple sclerosis. These studies have, for example, provided a basis for a clinical trial of the efficacy of phenytoin, a sodium channel blocker in patients with optic neuritis.

Waxman's studies have combined molecular genetics, molecular biology, and biophysics to show how specific ion channels relate to human pain. He has been a member of an international coalition that showed that sodium channel mutations can be a cause of peripheral neuropathy. He has used atomic-level modeling to study pharmacogenomics, at first in laboratory studies, and then in early studies on genomically guided approaches to the treatment of pain. A novel class of medications that target sodium channels in the peripheral nervous system, and that do not have potential for addiction, is based in part on his work and is currently being assessed in early-stage clinical trials.

Awards and distinctions
Waxman has been the recipient of many distinctions:

1973	- Trygve Tuve Memorial Award for Outstanding Contributions in the Biomedical Sciences, NIH
1975	- Research Career Development Award, NINCDS
1987	- Established Investigator, National Multiple Sclerosis Society
1991	- Distinguished Alumnus Award, Albert Einstein College of Medicine
1991	- Fellow, Royal Society of Medicine
1993	- Member, Dana Alliance for Brain Initiatives
1994	- Listed in The Best Doctors in America.
1995	- The Adrian Lecture (Xth International Congress of Clinical Neurophysiology)
1996	- Elected to Institute of Medicine, National Academy of Sciences
1999	- Landmark Award for Biomedical Research
1999	- Wartenberg Award, American Academy of Neurology
1999	- Honorary Senior Fellow, Institute of Neurology, London
2000	- Dystel Prize for Research on Multiple Sclerosis, American Academy of Neurology/NMSS
2004	- Reingold Award, National Multiple Sclerosis Society 
2005   - Honorary Member, Association of British Neurologists
2009	- W.I. McDonald Award, British Multiple Sclerosis Society
2009	- William S Middleton Award (highest scientific honor of the Department of Veterans Affairs, presented at Ceremonies at the U.S. Capitol).
2009	- Annual Review Prize, The Physiological Society (Premier Award of the Society; previous awardees include A.F. Huxley, A.L. Hodgkin)
2013   - Paul B. Magnuson Award for Outstanding Achievement in Rehabilitation Research, U.S. Department of Veterans Affairs
2013	- American Neurological Assoc/Annals of Neurology Prize for Distinguished Contribution to Clinical Neuroscience
2014	- Soriano Award, American Neurological Association
2018   - Julius Axelrod Prize, Society for Neuroscience

References 

1945 births
Living people
Harvard Medical School alumni
Yale School of Medicine faculty
American neurologists
American neuroscientists
American pain physicians
Members of the National Academy of Medicine